Kamalesh Sharma  (born 30 September 1941) is an Indian diplomat. He was the fifth Secretary General of the Commonwealth of Nations from 2008 to 2016, having previously served as the High Commissioner for India in London. He has served as the Chancellor Emeritus of Queen's University Belfast.

Early life and background
Kamalesh Sharma is an alumnus of the Modern School, Barakhamba Road, New Delhi, St. Stephen's College in Delhi and King's College, Cambridge.

Career
Sharma was an officer in the Indian Foreign Service from 1965 to 2001. He served as India's Permanent Representative to the United Nations, from Aug 1997 to May 2002, before his retirement from IFS.

From 2002 to 2004, he served as UN Secretary General's special representative to East Timor. He was appointed as the High Commissioner of India to Britain in 2004.

He is a Vice-President of the Royal Commonwealth Society. He has also been the Chancellor of Queen's University Belfast since July 2009.

Commonwealth Secretary-General
Sharma was elected to the position of secretary-general over Michael Frendo, foreign minister of Malta, during the biennial Commonwealth summit in Kampala, Uganda held from 22 to 24 November 2007. He took over from Sir Don McKinnon of New Zealand on 1 April 2008.

Sharma was re-elected on 30 October 2011 at the 2011 CHOGM.  He was unopposed, having been proposed by India and seconded by Pakistan.  His second and final four-year term began on 1 April 2012 and ended 30 March 2016.

Sharma has been criticised as a "decent but ineffective" Secretary-General by Hugh Segal, Canada's former special envoy to the Commonwealth, who commented that under Sharma's tenure, the organization has been "missing in action on Sri Lankan human rights, vicious anti-gay laws in some parts of Africa and continued weakness in the promotion of judicial independence and democracy."

Geoffrey Robertson QC described Sharma's tenure in the following terms: "...for eight years before 2016 it was led by an Indian diplomat who would not have known a human right if he fell over it.

Sharma responded to such criticism stating: “The most important point about the Commonwealth is that it engages with member states to advance the values template. I made five visits to Sri Lanka, but you can't keep on talking about it in public for the reason that work has to be done below the radar to carry political conviction."

During his eight-year tenure as Commonwealth Secretary-General, Sharma focused on the empowerment of young people, the advancement of women's political and economic rights and raising international awareness of challenges facing small states as pressing priorities.

Sharma was described by Arif Zaman, Executive Director of the Commonwealth Businesswomen's Network as "someone who has been a passionate, active and dedicated champion for women, combining advocacy with practical steps".

On Sharma's tenure, The Rt Hon Hugo Swire, UK Minister of State, Foreign and Commonwealth Office commented that Sharma "helped to guide the Commonwealth through a period of significant challenges and he can be rightly proud of the important developments that have taken place under his leadership, such as the introduction of the Commonwealth Charter".

At the opening ceremony of the Commonwealth Heads of Government Meeting in Malta, 27 November 2015, Joseph Muscat, Prime Minister of Malta stated that Sharma had "done a very good job at providing leadership and introducing new initiatives during his tenure." He gave thanks to Sharma "for his unflinching commitment to the Commonwealth", adding that "his legacy will undoubtedly be a positive one".

Chancellor of Queen's University, Belfast 
On 9 July 2009, Sharma was appointed Chancellor of Queen's University Belfast after the retirement of Senator George J. Mitchell.

Queen's says, he was responsible for cementing relations between Northern Ireland and India, which led to the country's investment in Northern Ireland businesses.

The position is a largely honorary title and Sharma said he was enormously proud to be given the job at Queen's.

References

External links
Biography of Kamalesh Sharma, Commonwealth Secretariat
Interview with Kamalesh Sharma – broadcast by Radio France Internationale, 5 October 2011

Commonwealth Secretaries-General
Indian Foreign Service officers
Alumni of King's College, Cambridge
1941 births
Living people
Chancellors of Queen's University Belfast
People from Delhi
St. Stephen's College, Delhi alumni
Permanent Representatives of India to the United Nations
Honorary Knights Grand Cross of the Royal Victorian Order
Modern School (New Delhi) alumni